
Gmina Inowłódz is a rural gmina (administrative district) in Tomaszów Mazowiecki County, Łódź Voivodeship, in central Poland.

The gmina contains part of the protected area called Spała Landscape Park.

Villages
Gmina Inowłódz contains the villages and settlements of Brzustów, Dąbrowa, Inowłódz, Konewka, Królowa Wola, Liciążna, Poświętne, Spała, Teofilów, Wytoka, Żądłowice and Zakościele.

Neighbouring gminas
Gmina Inowłódz is bordered by the gminas of Czerniewice, Lubochnia, Opoczno, Poświętne, Rzeczyca, Sławno and Tomaszów Mazowiecki.

References
 Polish official population figures 2006

Inowlodz
Tomaszów Mazowiecki County